Space Camp  may refer to:

Educational camps
 Biosphere 2, in Arizona
 Cosmodome, in Canada
 European Space Camp, in Norway
 Euro Space Center, in Belgium
 Space Camp Turkey
 Camps held at the former Space World in Japan
 Space Camp (United States), in Alabama, or its former counterparts in California and Florida
 Summer camps with a focus on space science; see List of summer camps

Films, music & video game
 SpaceCamp, a 1986 adventure film
 SpaceCamp (soundtrack), the soundtrack album for the film
 Space Camp, an album by Audio Karate
 Space Camp (video game), a 2009 video game published by Activision

See also